Woodlands North MRT station is an underground Mass Rapid Transit station in Woodlands, Singapore, located near Republic Polytechnic. The station is the northern terminus of the Thomson–East Coast line (TEL). It is located in a developing region in Woodlands North at Woodlands North Coast Road, off Admiralty Road West as part of the North Coast Innovation Corridor project that is planned for the future.

Plans were made for the northern terminus of the TEL to be linked with the Johor Bahru-Singapore RTS in 2011. Finally announced in 2012, the station is one of the first three TEL stations to be opened on 31 January 2020. The station is also projected to be the Singapore terminus of the Johor Bahru-Singapore RTS by 2026.

History

On 29 August 2012, this station was announced as part of the finalised plans for the then Thomson line by then Transport Minister Lui Tuck Yew. Before the station was built, the working names were 'Woodlands North', 'Republic Polytechnic' and 'Admiralty Park'. On 27 June 2014, Woodlands North was officially chosen following a public poll in May 2013.

On 15 August 2014, the Land Transport Authority (LTA) announced that Woodlands North station would be part of the proposed Thomson–East Coast MRT line (TEL). The station will be constructed as part of Phase 1, consisting of 3 stations between Woodlands North and Woodlands South, and is expected to be completed in 2019.

Contract T202 for the design and construction of Woodlands North Station and associated tunnels was awarded to Penta-Ocean Construction Co Ltd at a sum of S$337 million in November 2013. Construction started in 2014, and was completed in 2020. The station officially opened on 31 January 2020 as part of Stage 1 of the TEL.

RTS Link

In June 2011, it was announced that the northern terminus of the TEL will be connected to the proposed cross border rail link. On 16 January 2018, a bilateral agreement on the project was signed between Malaysia and Singapore, during the 8th Singapore-Malaysia Leaders' Retreat. The agreement finalised certain aspects of the project, including its maintenance facilities, operator, and customs facilities.

However, the project had to be postponed on 21 May 2019 due to financial implications on Malaysia's side. On 31 October that year, Malaysia agreed to resume the RTS project at a lower cost although the project is still suspended until 30 April 2020. Due to the COVID-19 pandemic, it was agreed that the project be suspended further until 31 July 2020. The project officially resumed on 30 July 2020 with a new completion target by end 2026.

The contract for the construction of the RTS Link Woodlands North station and associated tunnels was awarded to Penta-Ocean Construction Co Ltd at a contract value of S$932.8 million (US$ million). The contract includes the construction of Singapore's Customs, Immigration, and Quarantine (CIQ) building. Construction is expected to begin in the first quarter of 2021, with expected completion by the end of 2026. On 22 January 2021, construction of the Singaporean side of the RTS link began with a groundbreaking ceremony near the station. On 29 January 2021, China Communications Construction Company Limited (Singapore branch) was awarded the second contract to construct tunnels and viaducts at a value of S$180 million (US$135.24 million).

Station details

Design
The station's interior has a red and white scheme, inspired by the Singapore national flag, to welcome visitors coming from Malaysia. The station also features aluminium ceiling panels above the platforms which mimic the movements of the daily flux of commuters. The station has a much larger size compared to other MRT stations, as the station was set to accommodate the peak-hour traffic for travellers between Singapore and Johor Bahru. There are two exits from the station.

The station will have three levels, including an underground linkway to the Customs, Immigration, and Quarantine (CIQ) building. The station size, including the CIQ building, will be 10 times the typical size of an MRT station. The RTS station and the CIQ building, built next to the TEL station, will be integrated with the station via an underground concourse.

Artwork
As part of the Art-in-Transit, the artwork displayed here is "New Departures" by Amanda Heng, which explores borders and boundaries from a personal, rather than physical perspective. It was created to encourage commuters to take on their daily life with "courage and positivity." The artwork draws on the role of this station being the future interchange of the cross-border RTS link between Singapore and Johor Bahru.

References

External links

Orbix360 Walkthrough of the future RTS station

Railway stations in Singapore opened in 2020
Mass Rapid Transit (Singapore) stations